Lethrinus laticaudis, the grass emperor, is a species of emperor native to the western Pacific Ocean where they occur on coral reefs at depths of from .  Juveniles inhabit beds of sea grass and also in mangrove swamps.  It can reach a length of  TL though most do not exceed .  This species is commercially important and is also popular as a game fish.

Grass emperors are browny-grey with darker brown blotches and streaks along their sides. They have olive cheeks covered with white speckles, their pectoral fins are tinged with blue, and all other fins are tinged with pink. They also have fine blue lines radiating from their eyes, with some crossing the snout.

References

Lethrinidae
Fish described in 1877